

2007-08 Top 3 Standings

Medal winners

Final standings

References

Biathlon World Cup - Overall Men, 2008-09